Agnes Nalwanga, is a Ugandan businesswoman, management professional and corporate executive, who serves as the Head of Consumer Services at Umeme Limited, the largest electricity distribution company in Uganda. She is a member of the company's Senior Management Team.

Background and education
Nalwanga was born in Uganda, . She attended local schools for her primary and secondary education. Her first degree, a Bachelor of Commerce with Marketing as a major, was obtained from Makerere University, Uganda's oldest and largest public university. She followed that with a master's degree in Economic Policy and Management, also from Makerere. Later she obtained a Master of Business Administration from the Assam Don Bosco University, in Assam, India.

Career
Nalwanga has a career spanning over 20 years in management within Uganda's electricity sector, going back to the late 1990s, in the days of the defunct Uganda Electricity Board. Since 2006, she has worked with Umeme in various roles, including as Area Manager, Retail Services Manager and Regional Manager. In her various roles, she condemns the illegal practice of unauthorized sharing of electricity through clandestine wiring, which often leads to electrocutions and fires, especially in urban and suburban slums.

See also
 Florence Nsubuga
 Florence Mawejje
 Marie Solome Nassiwa
 Ruth Doreen Mutebe

References

External links
Website of Umeme Limited
The challenges you face and the skills that you need while improving the experience of your customers: An interview with experts on African Customer Experience management: Agnes Nalwanga: Head Of Customer Service, Umeme Limited, Uganda

1975 births
Ganda people
Living people
Makerere University alumni
Assam Don Bosco University alumni
21st-century Ugandan businesswomen
21st-century Ugandan businesspeople
People from Central Region, Uganda